Dhanraul Dam is also known as Dhandhraul Dam. It is located about 23 km from Robertsganj on the Robertsganj-Churk road, in Sonbhadra district, Uttar Pradesh, India. The dam was constructed over the river Ghaghar and water from its reservoir is used for irrigation by the canals originating from here like Ghaghar canal to the nearer districts Mirzapur, Chandauli and Sonbhadra. Dhanraul Dam's water supplies Robertsganj with drinking water. This dam is constructed on the Ghaghar River and is also called Ghaghar Dam.

Nearby
Vijaygarh Fort
Robertsganj
Churk

References

External links
 Tourism
Dams listing

Dams in Uttar Pradesh
Tourist attractions in Sonbhadra district
Buildings and structures in Sonbhadra district
Dams completed in 1917
1917 establishments in India
20th-century architecture in India